Lago di Rimasco is an artificial lake in the Province of Vercelli, Piedmont, Italy, situated in Rimasco, in the comune of Alto Sermenza in the Valsesia.

References 

Lakes of Piedmont
Province of Vercelli